The Battle of Arnemuiden was a naval battle fought on 23 September 1338 at the start of the Hundred Years' War between England and France. It was the first naval battle of the Hundred Years' War and the first recorded European naval battle using artillery, as the English ship Christopher had three cannons and one hand gun.

The battle featured a vast French fleet under admirals Hugues Quiéret and Nicolas Béhuchet against a small squadron of five great English cogs transporting an enormous cargo of wool to Antwerp, where Edward III of England was hoping to sell it, in order to be able to pay subsidies to his allies. It occurred near Arnemuiden, the port of the island of Walcheren (now in the Netherlands, but then part of the County of Flanders, formally part of the Kingdom of France). Overwhelmed by the superior numbers and with some of their crew still on shore, the English ships fought bravely, especially the Christopher under the command of John Kingston, who was also commander of the squadron. Kingston surrendered after a day's fighting and exhausting every means of defence.

The French captured the rich cargo, took the five cogs into their fleet and massacred the English prisoners. The chronicles write:

References

Naval battles of the Hundred Years' War
Conflicts in 1338
1338 in Europe
Arnemuiden
Battle of Arnemuiden
Hundred Years' War, 1337–1360